Daryl Ray "Bud" Hebert (born October 12, 1956) is a former American football defensive back in the National Football League (NFL) who played for the New York Giants. He played college football at University of Oklahoma.

References 

1956 births
Living people
People from Beaumont, Texas
Players of American football from Texas
American football defensive backs
Oklahoma Sooners football players
New York Giants players